Aorangia is a genus of South Pacific sheetweb spiders first described by Raymond Robert Forster & C. L. Wilton in 1973.

Species
 it contains sixteen species, all found in New Zealand:
Aorangia agama Forster & Wilton, 1973 – New Zealand
Aorangia ansa Forster & Wilton, 1973 – New Zealand
Aorangia fiordensis Forster & Wilton, 1973 – New Zealand
Aorangia isolata Forster & Wilton, 1973 – New Zealand
Aorangia kapitiensis Forster & Wilton, 1973 – New Zealand
Aorangia mauii Forster & Wilton, 1973 – New Zealand
Aorangia muscicola Forster & Wilton, 1973 – New Zealand
Aorangia obscura Forster & Wilton, 1973 – New Zealand
Aorangia otira Forster & Wilton, 1973 – New Zealand
Aorangia pilgrimi Forster & Wilton, 1973 – New Zealand
Aorangia poppelwelli Forster & Wilton, 1973 – New Zealand
Aorangia pudica Forster & Wilton, 1973 – New Zealand
Aorangia semita Forster & Wilton, 1973 – New Zealand
Aorangia silvestris Forster & Wilton, 1973 – New Zealand
Aorangia singularis Forster & Wilton, 1973 – New Zealand
Aorangia tumida Forster & Wilton, 1973 – New Zealand

References

Araneomorphae genera
Spiders of New Zealand
Stiphidiidae
Taxa named by Raymond Robert Forster